The Teloschistaceae are a large family of mostly lichen-forming fungi belonging to the class Lecanoromycetes in the division Ascomycota. The family, estimated to contain over 1800 species, was extensively revised in 2013, including the creation or resurrection of 31 genera. It contains three subfamilies: Xanthorioideae, Caloplacoideae, and Teloschistoideae. A fourth subfamily, Brownlielloideae, proposed in 2015, has been shown to be part of the Teloschistoideae.

Genera
This is a list of the genera contained within the Teloschistaceae, based on a 2020 review and summary of ascomycete classification. Following the genus name is the taxonomic authority, year of publication, and the number of species:
Amundsenia  – 2 spp.
Andina  - 1 sp.
Apatoplaca  – 1 sp.
Aridoplaca  - 1 sp.
Athallia  – 17 spp.
Austroplaca  – 10 spp.
Blastenia  – 11 spp.
Brownliella  – 4 spp.
Bryoplaca  – 3 spp.
Calogaya  – 19 spp.
Caloplaca  – 351 spp.
Catenarina  – 3 spp.
Cephalophysis  – 1 sp.
Cerothallia  – 4 spp.
Charcotiana  – 1 sp.
Cinnabaria  - 1 sp.
Coppinsiella  – 3 spp.
Dijigiella  – 2 spp.
Dufourea  (1809) – 25 spp.
Eilifdahlia  – 2 spp.
Elenkiniana  – 3 spp.
Elixjohnia  – 4 spp.
Erichansenia  – 3 spp.
Fauriea  – 2 spp.
Filsoniana  – 9 spp.
Flavoplaca  – 28 spp.
Follmannia  – 2 spp.
Fominiella  – 2 spp.
Franwilsia  – 3 spp.
Fulgensia  – 2 spp.
Fulgogasparrea  – 5 spp.
Gallowayella  – 15 spp.
Gintarasiella  – 1 sp.
Golubkovia  – 1 sp.
Gondwania  – 4 spp.
Gyalolechia  – 40 spp.
Haloplaca  – 31 spp.
Hanstrassia  – 2 spp.
Harusavskia  – 1 sp.
Honeggeria  – 1 sp.
Hosseusiella  – 3 spp.
Huneckia  – 4 spp.
Huriella  – 5 spp.
Igneoplaca  – 1 sp.
Ikaeria  – 2 spp.
Ioplaca  – 2 spp.
Jasonhuria  – 1 sp.
Jesmurraya  – 1 sp.
Josefpoeltia  – 3 spp.
Kaernefia  – 3 spp.
Langeottia  – 2 spp.
Lazarenkoiopsis  – 1 sp.
Lendemeriella  – 9 spp.
Leproplaca   – 7 spp.
Loekoesia  – 1 sp.
Loekoeslaszloa  – 2 spp.
Marchantiana  – 2 spp.
Martinjahnsia  – 1 sp.
Mikhtomia  – 4 spp.
Neobrownliella  – 5 spp.
Nevilleiella  – 2 spp.
Niorma  – 5 spp.
Olegblumia  – 1 sp.
Opeltia  – 4 spp.
Orientophila  – 4 spp.
Oxneria  – 4 spp.
Oxneriopsis  – 4 spp.
Pachypeltis  – 7 spp.
Parvoplaca  – 6 spp.
Pisutiella  – 6 spp.
Polycauliona  – 18 spp.
Pyrenodesmia  – 6 spp.
Raesaeneniana  – 1 sp.
Rehmaniella  – 1 sp.
Rufoplaca  – 10 spp.
Rusavskia  – 19 spp.
Sanguineodiscus – 4 spp.
Scutaria  – 1 sp.
Seawardiella  – 2 spp.
Seirophora  – 8 spp.
Shackletonia  – 5 spp.
Sirenophila  – 4 spp.
Solitaria  – 1 sp.
Squamulea  – 15 spp.
Stellarangia  – 3 spp.
Streimanniella  – 4 spp.
Tarasginia  – 2 spp.
Tassiloa  – 2 spp.
Tayloriellina  – 2 spp.
Teloschistes  – ca. 24 spp.
Teloschistopsis  – 3 spp.
Teuvoahtiana  – 3 spp.
Thelliana  – 1 sp.
Tomnashia  – 4 spp.
Upretia  – 2 spp.
Usnochroma  – 2 spp.
Variospora  – 16 spp.
Verrucoplaca  – 1 sp.
Villophora  – 9 spp.
Wetmoreana  – 2 spp.
Xanthocarpia  – 12 spp.
Xanthodactylon  – 2 spp.
Xanthomendoza  – 20 spp.
Xanthopeltis  – 1 sp.
Xanthoria  – 10 spp.
Yoshimuria  – 4 spp.
Zeroviella  – 8 spp.

References

Teloschistales
Lichen families
Lecanoromycetes families
Taxa named by Alexander Zahlbruckner
Taxa described in 1898